Cubworld (real name: Jake Kongaika) is a Hawaiian singer-songwriter and one of the first three artists to release their CD on the music website Sellaband with the raised US$50,000.

Discography
 The Sample - 2000 (2006).
 Step Lightly (Create Out Loud) (2007).
 Life Is Music (2013).

Guest appearances
 The Way I Feel (Available on Nemesea's 2007 album In Control)
 Sin City (Available on Maitreya's 2010 album. The track won New Zealand's Silver Scroll Maioha Award.)

References

External links

Cubworld Youtube
Cubworld Facebook
Cubworld Instagram
Cubworld Twitter
SellaBand.com website
SellaBand.com Cubworlds Profile
2nd SellaBand.com Profile

Musicians from Hawaii